Robert Frye (fl. 1385–1399), of Shoreham, Sussex, was an English politician.

He was a Member (MP) of the Parliament of England for New Shoreham in 1385, 1391, January 1397 and 1399.

References

Year of birth missing
Year of death missing
English MPs 1385
People from Shoreham-by-Sea
English MPs 1391
English MPs January 1397
English MPs 1399